JC Sapling Cup, more commonly known as Sapling Cup, is a Hong Kong domestic football competition contested by all the teams in the Hong Kong Premier League. The objective of the Cup is to provide more playing opportunities for youth players in Hong Kong.

HK$120,000 will go to the winners, with the runners-up getting HK$60,000. The two other losing semi-finalists will each receive HK$30,000, with the six remaining teams getting HK$15,000 each. Players will also be rewarded for their performances, with the best under-22 player from each team winning HK$3,000. The best of the best will earn an additional HK$5,000.

The current Sapling Cup holder is Eastern.

Competition name and Rules

Finals

Key

Results

Notes

Performance by clubs

See also
The Hong Kong Football Association
Hong Kong Premier League

References

External links
FA Cup, The Hong Kong Football Association website.
Hong Kong Football
RSSSF.com Hongkong - List of FA Cup Winners

 
Football cup competitions in Hong Kong